Fiona McIntosh (born 1960) is an English-born Australian author of adult and children's books. She was born in Brighton, England and between the ages of three and eight, travelled a lot to Africa due to her father's work. At the age of nineteen, she travelled first to Paris and later to Australia, where she has lived ever since. In 2007, she released a crime novel, Bye Bye Baby, under the pen name of Lauren Crow; however, the pen name was dropped for the republished edition of Bye Bye Baby and for the sequel, Beautiful Death.

Published works

Adult fiction

Trinity
Betrayal (2001)
Revenge (2002)
Destiny (2002)

The Quickening

Myrren's Gift (2003) 
Blood and Memory (2004)
Bridge of Souls (2004)

Percheron

Odalisque (2005)
Emissary (2006)
Goddess (2007)

Valisar
Royal Exile (2008)
Tyrant's Blood (2009)
King's Wrath (2010)

Jack Hawksworth series
Bye Bye Baby (2007, writing under the pen-name Lauren Crow)
Beautiful Death (2009)
Mirror Man (2021)
Dead Tide (2023)

Other novels
Fields of Gold (2010)
The Lavender Keeper (2012)
The Scrivener's Tale (2012, standalone novel set in the world of The Quickening)
The French Promise (2013, sequel to The Lavender Keeper)
The Tailor's Girl (2013)
Tapestry (2014)
Nightingale (2014)
The Last Dance (2015)
On The Scent of Purfume: The Making of the Perfumer's Secret (2015)
The Perfumer's Secret (2015)
The Chocolate Tin (2016)
The Tea Gardens (2017)
The Pearl Thief (2018)
The Diamond Hunter (2019)
The Champagne War (2020)
The Spy’s Wife (2021)
The Orphans (2022)

Short stories
The Batthouse Girl (2009) in Thanks for the Mammaries (ed. Sarah Darmody)

Children's fiction

Shapeshifter
Severo's Intent (2007)
Saxten's Secret (2007)
Wolf Lair (2007)
King of the Beasts (2007)

Other works
The Whisperer (2009)
The Rumpelgeist (2012)

Non fiction
How To Write Your Blockbuster (2015)

References

External links

 Fiona McIntosh's website
 Fiona McIntosh's Facebook Page

Australian fantasy writers
Australian crime writers
Australian people of Scottish descent
English people of Scottish descent
English emigrants to Australia
People from Brighton
1960 births
Living people
Women science fiction and fantasy writers
Australian women novelists
Women mystery writers
21st-century pseudonymous writers
Pseudonymous women writers